Kunaratnam Alagaratnam (born 29 October 1943) is a Malaysian field hockey player. He competed at the 1964 Summer Olympics and the 1968 Summer Olympics.

References

External links
 

1943 births
Living people
Malaysian male field hockey players
Olympic field hockey players of Malaysia
Field hockey players at the 1964 Summer Olympics
Field hockey players at the 1968 Summer Olympics
Malaysian people of Tamil descent
Malaysian sportspeople of Indian descent